There are over 20,000 Grade II* listed buildings in England.  This page is a list of these buildings in Hinckley and Bosworth.

Hinckley and Bosworth

|}

Notes

External links

 Hinckley and Bosworth
listed buildings
Hinckley and Bosworth